The División de Honor Juvenil is the top level of the Spanish football league system for youth players 18 years old and under. The División de Honor is administered by the RFEF through the Liga Nacional de Fútbol Aficionado (LNFA).

Format
The División de Honor begins the first weekend in September and ends in April or May. The División de Honor's season is similar to the senior players' La Liga playing a double round-robin points based system. There are seven groups of 16 teams. The teams with the most points in each group are declared champion of its group and advance to the Copa de Campeones Juvenil de Fútbol. In each group, the teams placing 13th and below are relegated to the Liga Nacional or the Canarias Preferente in the case of those teams from the Canary Islands (Group6).

History
Created in 1986, the Superliga Juvenil was a national league with 16 teams. However, traveling across the country caused financial hardships for some clubs. Real Valladolid (in 1993), and Las Palmas and Espanyol (in 1994) dropped out of the league. Real Madrid withdrew from the league in 1994 when their second reserve team Real Madrid C kept their status in the Segunda División B. 15 teams played in 1994–95 and the league was disbanded after the season. In 1995, the RFEF elevated the six regional based groups of the  División de Honor (which was the second level) as the top youth level and created a new tournament to crown the overall youth champion of Spain.

Copa de Campeones de Juvenil

The Copa de Campeones is a two phrase tournament that starts a week after the end of the División de Honor held at a site selected by the RFEF. 

Until 2011, the seven group winners were divided into two groups: Group A had three teams and was played in a round-robin format, while group B was composed by four and was played in a single elimination format.
The two group winners played the final match.

Since the 2011–12 season, the seven group winners and the best runner-up are drawn into a knock-out tournament in a neutral venue determined by the Royal Spanish Football Federation.

Each team nominates an 18-man roster. There are no replacements for sickness or injury even if it is a goalkeeper.

Since the 2014–15 season, the winner qualifies to the UEFA Youth League.

Copa del Rey Juvenil

16 teams qualify to the main domestic cup:
7 group winners
7 group runners-up
2 best third placed teams

History
Established in 1950, the Campeonato de España was Spain's top tournament for youth teams for over thirty years. Barcelona won the first cup, Copa de Su Excelencia Generalísimo or Copa del Generalísimo and has won the most Spanish Cups.Since 1976, teams are playing for the Copa de Su Majestad El Rey Don Juan Carlos I or Copa del Rey.

Format
Since 1995, the Campeonato de España/Copa del Rey started a week after the Copa de Campeones and is played in four rounds. 16 División de Honor teams qualify; the top two from each group plus the best two third-placed teams. The first round, Quarterfinal and Semifinal are played in two legs and the Final is one match at a neutral site.

Restructuring

2005–06
For the 2005–06 season, the RFEF reorganized Grupo IV of División de Honor as the Andaluza Group similar to the Canarias have in Grupo VI. Teams from the autonomous cities of Ceuta and Melilla also included.

2006–07
For the 2006–07 season, the RFEF added another 16-team regional group.

Champions

Superliga Juvenil

Liga de Honor Sub-19

División de Honor
In gold, champions of the Copa de Campeones; in silver, runners-up of this tournament.

References

External links
RFEF site (archived)
División de Honor: Results and tables at Resultados de Fútbol 

 
Juvenil
Spain
Youth football in Spain